Joseph Hatze (1879–1959) was one of the first and most prominent Croatian composers  in the Mediterranean style in the first half of last century.

Hatze was born in Split (then Austro-Hungarian Empire, now Croatia) to a family of craftsmen from Split. During school he was absorbed with musical events, especially with sacred music and folk songs. Accidentally discovering his musicality, and with family support, he attended all the performances in the newly opened Municipal Theater in Split. Strong experience of orchestral and choir performances in the Split theater encouraged the 16-year-old Hatze to sing at Chapel Mass. During that time he wrote "Misa a Kapela" (in Croatian text), which was performed with great success. Later other Dalmatian school choirs started performing his musical work.

He completed his studies in composition in 1902 at the Rossini Conservatory in Pesaro with the operatic composer Pietro Mascagni. Returning home to Split, he worked as a choir teacher at the Central Technical School in Split and was the choirmaster at the choral society Zvonimir.

During World War I, he was at the front, away from home, and did not know that his wife Gilda had died of the Spanish flu. Gilda was from the patrician Marulić family (related to Marko Marulić). Afterwards he was the choirmaster of the choral society Guslar. During World War II Hatze became a refugee in El Shatt in Egypt. There he organized a camp choir. Hatze taught the basics of music to his grandson, Ruben Radica (b. 1941), who became a professional musician, teacher and composer.

Hatze wrote up to 60 songs. He wrote the cantatas "Night at Una" (verses by Hugo Badalić), "Exodus" (1912) and  "Golemi Pan" (1917). The work "Golemi Pan" (Huge Pan) was written to the poetry of Vladimir Nazor. Hatze's sense of drama was applied in both the orchestral work of the operas of The Return (1910) and Adel and Mara (1932). The Return is the story of a Croatian peasant who had to go to a foreign land and then return to his family home.

Joseph Hatze died in Split at the age of 80.

On the 125th Anniversary of the birth of Josip Hatze, Croatia issued a stamp in his honor. In Split, a secondary music school, Glazbena Škola Josipa Hatzea (Josip Hatze Music School), is named in his honor, as is Hatzeov Perivoj (Hatze Park).

See also 
Music of Croatia
Split
Dalmatia

References

External links
 performed in HNK Split on a concert dedicated to Hatze's birth. The piece was done by Split's music schools choir and string orchestra.

1879 births
1959 deaths
Croatian composers
Romantic composers
Musicians from Split, Croatia
People from the Kingdom of Dalmatia
Austro-Hungarian military personnel of World War I
Male classical composers
Croatian refugees
20th-century male musicians
19th-century male musicians
Burials at Lovrinac Cemetery
Composers from the Austro-Hungarian Empire